Obscurity is the fifth studio album by Scar Tissue, released independently in August 2010.

Track listing

Personnel
Adapted from the Obscurity liner notes.

Scar Tissue
 Philip Caldwell – instruments
 Steve Watkins – instruments

Release history

References

External links 
 Obscurity at Bandcamp
 

2010 albums
Scar Tissue (band) albums